Maurice Risch (born 25 January 1943, in Paris) is a French film and theatre actor.

Filmography

External links

Maurice Risch at Allmovie
 Maurice Risch Biography, Photos, Film Posters

1943 births
Living people
French male film actors
French comedians
Male actors from Paris
French male stage actors
French National Academy of Dramatic Arts alumni